Spinturnicidae is a family of mites in the order Mesostigmata. The mites are highly specialized parasites of wing or tail membrane or bats. Some species infest eyelids and eye canthi. The species of Spinturnicidae are found in bat habitats throughout the world, living all stages of life on bats.

Genera
These 11 genera belong to the family Spinturnicidae:
 Ancystropus Kolenati, 1856
 Cameronieta Machado-Allison, 1965
 Emballonuria Uchikawa, Zhang, O'Connor & Klompen, 1994
 Eyndhovenia Rudnick, 1960
 Meristaspis Kolenati, 1857
 Mesoperiglischrus Dusbábek, 1968
 Oncoscelus Delfinado & Baker, 1963
 Parameristaspis Advani & Vazirani, 1981
 Paraperiglischrus Rudnick, 1960
 Periglischrus Kolenati, 1857
 Spinturnix von Heyden, 1826

References

Mesostigmata
Parasites of bats
Taxa named by Anthonie Cornelis Oudemans
Acari families